Lucas Fischer (born October 29, 1994) is an American-Armenian basketball player for Real Betis of the Liga ACB and the Armenian national basketball team. He played college basketball for Indiana University and Marquette University.

College career
As a high school player at Germantown High School, Fischer was named Wisconsin Mr. Basketball, Gatorade state player of the year, and a Parade All-American. Fischer originally chose college basketball power Indiana. He played 13 games for the Hoosiers, averaging 2.8 points and 2.1 rebounds per game. He decided to transfer after the first semester his freshman year, ultimately choosing Marquette. Fischer was a significant player for the Golden Eagles, averaging 10.3 points and 5.1 rebounds in 24.8 minutes per game over his three-year career.

Professional career
After going undrafted in the 2017 NBA draft, Fischer signed his first professional contract with Herbalife Gran Canaria in Spain's Liga ACB and EuroCup competition. Fischer averaged 5.0 points per game, 0.6 assists per game and 2.3 points per game his first seasons with Herbalife. During his seconds season Fischer averaged 3.1 points per game and 2.3 rebounds per game.  

On August 12, 2019, he has signed with s.Oliver Würzburg of the German Basketball Bundesliga.  Fischer averaged 12.9 points per game, 2.2 assists per game and 5.8 rebounds per game during the 2019–20 season.

On July 17, 2020, he has signed with Orléans Loiret Basket of the French Pro A. Fischer averaged 12.5 points and 5.7 rebounds per game. On July 18, 2021, he signed with Nanterre 92.

On July 25, 2022, he has signed with SLUC Nancy Basket of the French Pro A.

On January 1, 2023, he signed with Real Betis of the Liga ACB.

National team career
In the summer of 2017, Fischer played for the Armenia national basketball team in the 2019 FIBA World Cup pre-qualifiers.

Personal life
Fischer proposed to his girlfriend, Payton Brock, on his senior night at Marquette on March 4, 2017. They married on August 4, 2018. In 2019 the couple had a daughter, and in 2021 they had a son.

See also
 Golden Eagles (TBT)

References

External links
s.Olivier Würzburg profile
Marquette Golden Eagles bio
College stats@sports-reference.com

1994 births
Living people
American expatriate basketball people in France
American expatriate basketball people in Germany
American expatriate basketball people in Spain
American men's basketball players
Armenian men's basketball players
Armenian people of American descent
Basketball players from Milwaukee
CB Gran Canaria players
Centers (basketball)
Indiana Hoosiers men's basketball players
Liga ACB players
Marquette Golden Eagles men's basketball players
Nanterre 92 players
Orléans Loiret Basket players
Parade High School All-Americans (boys' basketball)
People from Germantown, Wisconsin
s.Oliver Würzburg players
SLUC Nancy Basket players